Ningwood is a village on the Isle of Wight. It is on several lanes about three miles east of Yarmouth in the northwest of the island. According to the Post Office to 2011 Census population of the village was included in the civil parish of Shalfleet.  The Horse and Groom Pub is a prominent establishment in Ningwood, as is the Ningwood Bible Christian (Methodist) Chapel. Well-known island brickmakers, the Prichett family, established a brick yard in Ningwood in the 19th century.

It is linked to other parts of the Island by Southern Vectis bus route 7, serving Freshwater, Yarmouth and Newport including intermediate towns.

References

External links
Isle of Wight Brickmaking History, Isle of Wight Industrial Archaeology Society

Villages on the Isle of Wight